This is a list of historical separatist movements around the world. Separatism includes autonomism and secessionism. Most separatist movements do not succeed in their goal, therefore only notable ones are listed here; however, not all listed here succeeded in their goal.

Africa

Algeria 
(To Gain independence from Algeria on July 5, 1962)

 Political party: Mouvement D'Auto-Détermination De la Kabylie (MAK)
 Rebel organization: Front de Libération Nationale is calling for its dissolution. The French is describing it as a terrorist movement.
 Parallel government: Provisional

Angola 
 Political party: Popular Movement for the Liberation of Angola (MPLA), National Union for the Total Independence of Angola (UNITA), National Front for the Liberation of Angola (FNLA)
 Parallel government: Revolutionary Government of Angola in Exile (GRAE)

Botswana 
 Political party: Botswana Democratic Party (BDP), Botswana People's Party (BPP)

Burundi 
 Political party: Union for National Progress (UPRONA)

Martyazo 
 Rebel organisation: Hutu

Cameroon 
 Political party: Rassemblement camerounais (RACAM), Union of the Peoples of Cameroon (UPC)
 Rebel organizations: National Liberation Army of Kamerun (ALNK)

Cape Verde and Guinea-Bissau 
 Political party: African Party for the Independence of Guinea and Cape Verde (PAIGC), Struggle Front for the National Independence of Guinea (FLING)

Central African Republic 
 Political party: Movement for the Social Evolution of Black Africa (MÉSAN)

Côte d'Ivoire 
Rebel organization: Patriotic Movement of Côte d'Ivoire (MPCI)

Democratic Republic of the Congo 
 Political party: Mouvement National Congolais (MNC), ABAKO

Katanga 
 Political party: Confederation of the Tribal Associations of Katanga (CONAKAT)

Egypt 
Political party: Wafd Party

Eritrea 
 Rebel organization: Eritrean Liberation Front (ELF), Eritrean People's Liberation Front (EPLF)

France (associated territories) 
Réunion
Autonomist movement
Political party: Communist Party of Réunion (which still exists, but has abandoned its goal of autonomy)

Ghana 
 Political party: Convention People's Party (CPP), United Gold Coast Convention (UGCC)
 Self-government experiment: Fante Confederation

Kenya 
 Political party: East Africa Association, Kenya African National Union (KANU), Kikuyu Central Association, Young Kikuyu Association
 Rebel organization: Kenya Land and Freedom Army (KLFA or Mau Mau)

Mali 
 Political party: Sudanese Union (US)

Mauritius 
 Political party: Mauritius Labour Party (MLP), Mauritian Militant Movement (MMM)

Morocco 
 Political party: Istiqlal Party, National Action Bloc

Mozambique 
 Political party: Mozambican Liberation Front (FRELIMO)

Namibia 
 Political party: South-West Africa People's Organisation (SWAPO), South West Africa National Union (SWANU)
 Rebel organizations: People's Liberation Army of Namibia (PLAN),

Niger 
 Political party: Nigerien Progressive Party, Sawaba

Nigeria 
 Political party: Nigerian National Democratic Party (NNDP), National Council of Nigeria and the Cameroons (NCNC), Action Group, Egbe Omo Oduduwa, Northern People's Congress
 Secessionist entity: Republic of Biafra

São Tomé and Príncipe 
 Political party: Committee for the Liberation of São Tomé and Príncipe (CLSTP), Movement for the Liberation of São Tomé and Príncipe (MLSTP)

Seychelles 
 Political party: Seychelles Democratic Party (SDP), Seychelles People's United Party (SPUP)

Sierra Leone 
 Political party: Sierra Leone People's Party (SLPP), West African Youth League (WAYL)

Somalia 
 Political party: Somali Youth League (SYL)

Somaliland 
 Rebel organization: Somali National Movement (SNM)

South Africa 
 Secessionist movement: Eastern Cape Separatist League

Sudan 
 Political party: Democratic Unionist Party (DUP), Sudanese Communist Party, Umma Party

Tanzania

Tanganyika 
 Political party: Tanganyika African Association, Tanganyika African National Union

Zanzibar 
 Political party: Afro-Shirazi Party (ASP), Zanzibar Nationalist Party (ZNP)

Tunisia 
 Political party: Destour, Young Tunisians, Neo Destour (ND)

Uganda 
 Political party: Rwenzururu Secessionist Movement, Uganda People's Congress (UPC)

Zambia 
 Political party: Northern Rhodesian African National Congress, United National Independence Party (UNIP), Zambian African National Congress (ZANC)

Zimbabwe 
 Political party: Zimbabwe African National Union (ZANU), Zimbabwe African People's Union (ZAPU)
 Rebel organizations: Zimbabwe African National Liberation Army (ZANLA), Zimbabwe People's Revolutionary Army (ZIPRA)

Asia

Bangladesh 
 People: Jumma people
 Political party: Porbotto Chottogram Jonshonghoti Shomiti
 Rebel organisation: Shanti Bahini
 Proposed state: Autonomous Hill Tribes
 Status: Inactive following the 1996 peace treaty between the Government of Bangladesh and the tribal leaders.
 People: Bengali Hindus
 Political party: Swadhin Bangabhumi Andolan
 Rebel organisation: Banga Sena
 Proposed State: Bangabhumi

China 
Mainland China
 De facto state: 
Political party: Chinese Communist Party
Armed organization: Chinese Red Army
 Proposed state: 
 Political party: Chinese Communist Party

Outer Mongolia
 De facto state:  Great Mongolian State
Political organization: Bogd Khanate
 Proposed state:  Mongolian People's Republic
 Political party: Mongolian People's Revolutionary Party

Cyprus 
 Rebel organizations: EOKA, Turkish Resistance Organisation

France (associated territories)
Indochina
 Proposed state:  Kingdom of Cambodia
 Political organization: Khmer Issarak

 Proposed state:  Laos
 Militant organization: Lao Issara, Pathet Lao

 Proposed state:  Democratic Republic of Vietnam
 Political organization: Viet Minh

Mandate of Syria
Political organization: National Bloc

India 
 People: Sikh 
 Militant organisation:  Khalistan Liberation Force, Babbar Khalsa, Khalistan Commando Force 
 Proposed state: Khalistan
 Status: Separatist movement crushed 
 People: Tripuri 
 Militant organisation: National Liberation Front of Tripura, All Tripura Tiger Force 
 Proposed state:  Tipperaland
 Status: Separatist movement crushed 
 People: Garo, Khasi 
 Militant organisation: Garo National Liberation Army, Hynniewtrep National Liberation Council 
 Proposed state:  Garoland, Hynniewtrep 
 Status: Separatist movement crushed 
 People: Bodo 
 Militant organisation: National Democratic Front of Boroland
 Proposed state:  Boroland
 Status: Separatist groups disbanded, surrender agreement signed with government.
 People: Karbi 
 Militant organisation: Karbi Longri N.C. Hills Liberation Front, United People's Democratic Solidarity 
 Proposed state:  Hemprek Kangthim
 Status: Separatist movement crushed. Groups disbanded, surrender agreement signed with government.
 People: Dimasa 
 Militant organisation: Dima Halam Daogah 
 Proposed state:  Dimaraji
 Status: Separatist movement crushed. Groups disbanded, surrender agreement signed with government.
 People: Tani 
 Militant organisation: National Liberation Council of Taniland 
 Proposed state:  Taniland
 Status: Separatist movement crushed

Indonesia 
Aceh
Proposed state:  Aceh
 Militant organization: Free Aceh Movement

Timor
Proposed state: 
Political party: Revolutionary Front for an Independent East Timor

Japan 
Ezo
 De facto state: Republic of Ezo

Maldives 
Suvadives
 Proposed state:  United Suvadive Republic

Netherlands (associated territories)
Dutch East Indies
Proposed state:  Republic of Indonesia
 Political party: Nationalist Party of Indonesia

Oman 
Dhofar
 Militant organizations: Dhofar Liberation Front (DLF), Popular Front for the Liberation of Oman (PFLO), Popular Front for the Liberation of the Occupied Arabian Gulf/Popular Front for the Liberation of Oman and the Arabian Gulf (PFLOAG)

Pakistan 
East Pakistan
People: Bengalis (East Pakistanis)
 Political party: Bangladesh Awami League
 Rebel organization: Mukti Bahini
De facto'' state:  People's Republic of Bangladesh
Status: Resulted in independence of Bangladesh in 1971 after the Bangladesh Liberation War.

 Philippines 
Bangsamoro (Mindanao, Sulu Islands, and Palawan)
 Proposed state:  Bangsamoro Republik (MNLF)
 Political organization: Moro National Liberation Front
 Militant organization: Bangsamoro Armed Forces

 Proposed state: Bangsamoro Autonomous Region (originally for independence)
 Political organization: Moro Islamic Liberation Front
 Militant organization: Bangsamoro Islamic Armed Forces

 Spain (associated territories)
Spanish East Indies
Philippine archipelago
 Secessionist entities:  Katagalugan,  Republic of the Philippines,  Cantonal Republic of Negros, Republic of Zamboanga
 Militant organization: Katipunan
 Society: La Liga Filipina
Ilocos
Secessionist state:  Free Ilocos

Sri Lanka
Sri Lankan Tamil people
 Proposed state: Tamil Eelam
 Political party: Tamil National Alliance
 Militant organisation: Liberation Tigers of Tamil Eelam
 Advocacy groups: Transnational Government of Tamil Eelam, Global Tamil Forum
 Government in exile: Transnational Government of Tamil Eelam

 Turkey 
 Political party: Armenian Revolutionary Federation, Social Democrat Hunchakian Party, Armenian Democratic Liberal Party (Ramgavar Party)
 Rebel organization: Armenian Secret Army for the Liberation of Armenia

 United Kingdom (associated territories)
Burma
 Political organization: Dobama Asiayone
 Militant organization: Anti-Fascist People's Freedom League, Burma Independence Army, Communist Party of Burma

India
 Proposed state: 
 Political party: All India Forward Bloc, Hindustan Socialist Republican Association, Indian National Congress, Communist Party of India, Swaraj Party, Ghadar Party
 Parallel government: Arzi Hukumat-e-Azad Hind
 Rebel organization: Indian National Army

Malaya
 Proposed state:  Federation of Malaya
 Political party: Alliance Party (United Malays National Organisation, Malayan Chinese Association, and Malayan Indian Congress)
Penang
Ethnic groups: Penangites, Penangite Chinese
Proposed state:  Penang
Organization: Penang Chamber of Commerce

 United States (associated territories)
Commonwealth of the Philippines
 Political party: Nacionalista Party
 Proposed state:  Republic of the Philippines

Mindanao
Ethnic group: Maranao
Proposed state: Separate independence for Mindanao from the Luzon and Visayas regions. (See Dansalan Declaration)

 Europe 
 Albania 
 League of Prizren
 Northern Epirus

 Belgium 
 Political parties
Flemish
Vlaams Belang, New Flemish Alliance
Sociaal-Liberale Partij member of the European Free Alliance

 Bulgaria 
 Political party: Bulgarian Revolutionary Central Committee, Internal Revolutionary Organisation

 Czech Republic 
 Political party: Young Czech Party, Czech National Social Party

 Finland 
 Political movement: Fennoman 
 Political party: Finnish Party, Young Finnish Party
 
 Political movement: Åland movement

 France 
   (also in Spain)
 Political parties: Basque Nationalist Party, Basque Unity
 Rebel organization: Basque homeland and Freedom (ETA)
 
 Political parties: Corsica Nazione, Partitu di a Nazione Corsa 
 
 Political parties: Union Démocratique Bretonne, Breton Party 
 Rebel organization: Breton Revolutionary Army, Liberation Front of Brittany 

Political parties : Alsace d'abord *

 Germany 
 Short-lived Republic: Rhenish Republic
 Lower Saxony
 Alemannic Separatism
 Bavarian Soviet Republic
  Saarland
 Political parties: Christian People's Party of Saarland, Social Democratic Party of Saarland
 Goals: De facto independence of Saarland under status of a European territory, acceptance of the Saar statute

 Greece 
(Gained independence from the Ottoman Empire after the Greek War of Independence)

 Society: Filiki Eteria
 Unrecognized state: Areopagus of Eastern Continental Greece, Peloponnesian Senate, Senate of Western Continental Greece, Provisional Administration of Greece (after 1822)
 Militant organisations: Armatoloi/Klephts, Sacred Band, Hellenic Army, Hellenic Navy

 Ireland 
(See also under UK, for pre-division Ireland)
Home Rule League
Irish National League
Irish Parliamentary Party
Irish Republican Brotherhood
Provisional Government of the Irish Republic
Sinn Féin
Society of United Irishmen
United Irish League
Young Ireland

 Italy 
  (Sardinian nationalism)
 (Sicilian nationalism)
  (Venetian nationalism)

 North Macedonia 
Albanian-inhabited communities in SR Macedonia and the Republic of Macedonia
Ethnic group: Albanians
Political parties: Democratic Party of Albanians, Party for Democratic Prosperity
Goals: Autonomy (1994–99), independence and/or unification with Republic of Kosovo (2000–01)
Events: Insurgency in the Republic of Macedonia
Timespan: 1994–2001

Serbian-inhabited communities in the Republic of Macedonia
Ethnic group: Serbs
Political parties: Democratic Party of Serbs in Macedonia, Radical Party of the Serbs in Macedonia
Goals: Autonomy (Serbian Autonomous Region of Kumanovo Valley and Skopska Crna Gora)
Timespan: 1992

 Ottoman Empire 

 Ethnic group: Greeks
 Organization: Filiki Eteria

 Ethnic group: Serbs
 Organization: Serbian rebels

 Ethnic group: Bulgarians
 Organization: Bulgarian revolutionaries, Opalchentsi

 Poland 
 Narodowa Demokracja
 Towarzystwo Demokratyczne Polskie (Polish Democratic Society)
 Union of Upper Silesians
 Silesian People's Party

 Slovakia 
 Political party: Slovak National Party

Soviet Union
 Political parties: 
 Azerbaijani Popular Front Party
 Belarusian People's Front
 Rahvarinne
 Popular Front of Latvia, Latvian National Independence Movement
 Sąjūdis
 Moldovan Popular Front
 People's Movement of Ukraine (Rukh)
 Organization of Ukrainian Nationalists
 Ukrainian Insurgent Army

 Spain 
  Basque Country (also in France)
 Political parties: Aralar Party, Basque Nationalist Party, Batasuna, Eusko Abertzale Ekintza, Eusko Alkartasuna, Nafarroa Bai
 Rebel organizations: Basque homeland and Freedom (ETA), SEGI

 Political parties: Convergence and Union (Democratic Convergence of Catalonia + Democratic Union of Catalonia), Republican Left of Catalonia, Catalan State, Popular Unity Candidacy, Democrats of Catalonia, Left Movement, Catalan Solidarity for Independence, Reagrupament, National Front of Catalonia
 Rebel organizations: Terra Lliure (disbanded), Exèrcit Popular Català (disbanded)
 Organizations: Assemblea Nacional Catalana, Òmnium Cultural
 Labour unions: Intersindical-CSC, Coordinadora Obrera Sindical
  
 Political Parties: Galician Nationalist Bloc, Nós-Unidade Popular 
 
 Political parties: Bloque por Asturies, Unidá Nacionalista Asturiana, Andecha Astur 
 Rebel organization: Andecha Obrera (disbanded)
  
 Political party: Congreso Nacional de Canarias, Frepic-Awañak, Unión del Pueblo Canario 
 Organizations: MPAIAC 
 Armed groups: Fuerzas Armadas Guanches

 United Kingdom 
: New Cornish Tertia army, An Gof, Cornish Solidarity
: Vectis National Party
: Irish Republican Brotherhood, Clan na Gael, Young Ireland, Home Rule League, Irish Socialist Republican Party, Irish Parliamentary Party, All-for-Ireland League, Nationalist Party (Northern Ireland), Irish Independence Party 
: Scottish National Liberation Army
: Cymru Fydd, Cymru Goch, Welsh Socialist Alliance, Welsh Republican Movement 

 Isle of Man 
: Fo Halloo, Manx National Party

 Yugoslavia 
 Croatia (SR Croatia, SFR Yugoslavia)
Ethnic group: Croats
Political parties: Croatian Democratic Union, Croatian Party of Rights, Croatian Peasant Party
Armed organizations: Croatian National Guard
Events: Croatian Spring, War in Croatia
Goals: Independence

Republic of Kosovo (AP Kosovo and Metohija, SR Serbia, FR Yugoslavia)
Ethnic group: Albanians in Kosovo
Political parties: Democratic League of Kosovo, Alliance for the Future of Kosovo, Democratic Party of Kosovo, National Movement for the Liberation of Kosovo, The People's Movement for Kosovo
Armed organizations: Kosovo Liberation Army, Armed Forces of the Republic of Kosovo
Events: Insurgency in Kosovo (1993–98), Kosovo War
Goals: Larger autonomy (until 1989); Independence (1990–2003)

Preševo Valley (SR Serbia, FR Yugoslavia)
Ethnic group: Albanians in southern Serbia
Events: Insurgency in the Preševo Valley

 North America 
 Antigua and Barbuda 
 Political party: Antigua Labour Party

 Bahamas 
 Abaco (defunct)
 Progressive Liberal Party (PLP)

 Belize 
 Political party: People's United Party

 British West Indies 
 Political party: Caribbean League
 Secessionist entity: West Indies Federation

 Canada 
 Autonomist 
  Acadia
 Political party: Parti Acadien
  Cape Breton Island
 Political party: Cape Breton Labour Party
 the Maritimes
 Political party: the Maritimes
  Ontario
 Political party: Northern Ontario Heritage Party
  Quebec
 Political party: Action démocratique du Québec

 Secessionist 
 Nova Scotia
 Political: Anti-Confederation Party
 Ontario
 Political: Ontario Independence League, Northern Ontario Heritage Party
 Quebec
 Pressure group: Alliance Laurentienne, Chevaliers de l'Indépendance, Mouvement de Libération Nationale du Québec, Réseau de Résistance du Québécois
 Political party: Mouvement Souveraineté-Association, Option citoyenne, Parti de la Democratie Socialiste, Parti indépendantiste, Parti nationaliste du Québec, Option nationale, Ralliement National, Rassemblement pour l'Indépendance Nationale, Union des forces progressistes, Parti québécois, Union Populaire, Québec solidaire
 Rebel organization: Société des Fils de la Liberté, Frères Chasseurs, Comité de libération nationale (Quebec), Réseaux de résistance, Armée révolutionnaire du Québec, Front de libération du Québec
 Western Canada
 Political: Unionest Party, Separation Party of Alberta, Alberta Independence Party

 Costa Rica 
 Political party: Independent Guanacaste Party

 Dominica 
 Political party: Dominica Labour Party

 Haiti 
 Cacos (anti-US occupation)

 Jamaica 

 Political party: Jamaica Labour Party, People's National Party

 Mexico 
Secessionist
California Republic
Chan Santa Cruz
Republic of Fredonia
Republic of the Rio Grande
Republic of Texas
Republic of Yucatán
Republic of Baja California
Republic of Sonora

 Nicaragua 
 Ejército Defensor de la Soberanía Nacional (anti-US occupation)

 Panama 
 Kuna Revolution (Republic of Tule)

 Trinidad and Tobago 
 Political party: People's National Movement
Political party: Tobago Organisation of the People

 United States 
American Revolution
Aztlán
Confederate States of America
New England's Secession Conventions of 1803, 1808, 1814, and 1843
Republic of New Afrika
State of Franklin, secessionist North Carolina western territory (1784–1789)
State of Muskogee, secessionist Florida territory (1799 - 1803)
For historic Texas separatist movements, see Mexico, above.

 Puerto Rico 
Anti-Colonial National Liberation Movement
Puerto Rican Independence Movement
Partido Independentista Puertorriqueño (PIP)

 Oceania 
 Australia 
Mainland Australia
 (See: Secessionism in Tasmania)
 (See: Secessionism in Western Australia)

Eastern New Guinea
 Proposed state: Papua
 Political party: Papua Besena

 New Zealand 

South Island
 Proposed autonomous region: New Munster
 Political parties: South Island Party
 Pressure group: Southern Separation League
Western Samoa
 Protest movement: Mau movement

 United Kingdom (associated territories) 
Solomon Islands
 Protest movement: Maasina Ruru

 South America 
 Argentina 
Patagonia
 Proposed state:  Kingdom of Araucanía and Patagonia

 Bolivia 
Media Luna
 Pressure Group: Nación Camba

 Brazil 
  Rio Grande do Sul
Political party: Movimento da República Rio-Grandense
Proposed state:  Riograndense Republic
  Santa Catarina
Political party: Frente de Libertação da República Catarinense
Proposed state:  Juliana Republic
  São Paulo
Political party: Movimento República de São Paulo, Movimento São Paulo Independente, Constitutionalist Revolution of 1932, 1924 Paulista Revolt, 1887 Manifest, Acclaim of Amador Bueno.
Proposed state:  Republic of São Paulo
 Parts of  Pernambuco,  Paraíba and  Ceará
Proposed state:  Confederation of the Equator

 Chile 
Araucanía
 Proposed state:  Kingdom of Araucanía and Patagonia

 Colombia 
 Parts of Andean Region
Rebel organization:  Revolutionary Armed Forces of Colombia (FARC)
 Secessionist entities: Marquetalia Republic and several other communist-oriented Independent Republics Parts of Andean and  Caribbean regions
 Secessionist entities: Several provinces under leadership of Jefes Supremos''
 Goals: Federalization of New Granada
  Antioquia
 Pressure Group: Antioquia Rebelde (part of Medellin Cartel)
  Arauca
 Secessionist entity: Republic of Arauca
  Caribbean Region
 Pressure Group: Liga Costeña
 Cauca State
 Political Party: Liberal Party
 Goals: Annexation to Ecuador (1832), reforming the Grenadine Confederation (1860–1862)
 Parts of  Nariño and  Putumayo
 Rebel organization:  Royalist guerrillas (1822–1825)
 Pressure Group: Catholic clergy (1839–1842)
 Political party: Conservative Party (1860–1862)
 Goals: Restoring Spanish rule (1822–1825), annexation to Ecuador (1839–1842; 1860–1862)
 Panama State
 Political Party: Liberal Party
 Secessionist entity: Isthmus State (1840–1841),  Republic of Panama (1903–)

Guyana 
 Political party: People's Progressive Party
 Political party: People's National Congress

Peru 
 Federal State of Loreto 
 Loretan Insurrection of 1896

Spanish America 
 Logia Lautaro

See also 
 List of historical unrecognized states and dependencies
 List of active separatist movements recognized by intergovernmental organizations
 Lists of separatist movements

References 

 
Historical autonomist and secessionist movements
Separatism
Politics-related lists
Historical